Edward Price (born 1840, date of death unknown) was a Union Navy sailor in the American Civil War and a recipient of the U.S. military's highest decoration, the Medal of Honor, for his actions at the Battle of Mobile Bay.

Born in 1840 in New York, Price was still living in that state when he joined the Navy. Throughout the Battle of Mobile Bay on August 5, 1864, he helped work one of Brooklyn's artillery pieces, at one point fixing the disabled gun by clearing a broken sponge from its barrel. For this action, he was awarded the Medal of Honor four months later, on December 31, 1864.

Price's official Medal of Honor citation reads:
On board the U.S.S. Brooklyn during successful attacks against Fort Morgan, rebel gunboats and the ram Tennessee in Mobile Bay, 5 August 1864. When the sponge broke, leaving the head in the gun, and completely disabling the weapon, Price immediately cleared it by pouring powder into the vent and blowing the sponge head out, thereafter continuing to man the weapon until the close of the furious action which resulted in the capture of the prize rebel ram Tennessee and in the infliction of damage and destruction on Fort Morgan.

References 

1840 births
Year of death unknown
Military personnel from New York (state)
People of New York (state) in the American Civil War
Union Navy sailors
United States Navy Medal of Honor recipients
American Civil War recipients of the Medal of Honor